The women's shot put event at the 2021 European Athletics U23 Championships was held in Tallinn, Estonia, at Kadriorg Stadium on 10 July 2021.

Records
Prior to the competition, the records were as follows:

Results

Qualification
Qualification rule: 16.50 (Q) or the 12 best results (q) qualified for the final.

Final

References

Shot put
Shot put at the European Athletics U23 Championships